Saint George's Channel in the Bismarck Archipelago, lies between New Ireland and New Britain. It is named by analogy with St George's Channel between Great Britain and Ireland.

History 
During World War II Saint George's Channel was used by the Imperial Japanese Navy connecting Rabaul to the open sea and for ships bound for the Solomon Islands. Allied missions against Japanese forces at Cape St. George and St. George's Channel 
were conducted at December 31, 1942 - October 26, 1944.

See also 
Battle of Cape St. George

References 

Straits of Papua New Guinea